Buddies is a 1919 Broadway musical by George V. Hobart and with music by Bentley Collingwood Hilliam.  After an initial run in Boston starting on August 12, it opened at the Selwyn Theatre on October 17, 1919, and played for 259 performances through June 12, 1920.

Principal Broadway cast

 Camile Dalberg as Madame Benoit
 Peggy Wood as Julie
 Roland Young as Babe
 Donald Brian as Sonny
 Maxine Brown as Louise Maitland
 Richard Cramer as Rube
 Edouard Durand as Alphone Pettibois
 Pauline Garon as Babette
 Robert Middlemass as Biff

References

External links 

1919 musicals
Musicals about World War I
Plays set in France
Broadway musicals